The 2021–2022 session is the current session of the California State Legislature. The session first convened on December 7, 2020.

Major events

Vacancies and special elections 

December 6, 2020: Democratic senator Holly Mitchell (30th–Los Angeles) resigns one day before the session begins to take her seat on the Los Angeles County Board of Supervisors
January 29, 2021: Democratic assemblymember Shirley Weber (79th–San Diego) resigns to become Secretary of State
March 11, 2021: Democratic assemblymember Sydney Kamlager (54th–Los Angeles) resigns and is sworn into office after winning the March 2 special election for the 30th State Senate district to replace Mitchell
April 19, 2021: Democratic councilmember Akilah Weber (La Mesa) is sworn into office after winning the April 6 special election for the 79th State Assembly district to replace her mother
April 23, 2021: Democratic assemblymember Rob Bonta (18th–Alameda) resigns to become Attorney General 
May 28, 2021: Democratic policy advisor Isaac Bryan (Los Angeles) is sworn into office after winning the May 18th special election for the 54th State Assembly district to replace Kamlager
September 7, 2021: Democratic school board member Mia Bonta (Alameda) is sworn into office after winning the August 31 special election for the 18th State Assembly district to replace her husband 
October 31, 2021: Democratic assemblymember David Chiu (17th-San Francisco) resigns to become the City Attorney of San Francisco 
December 10, 2021: Democratic assemblymember Ed Chau (49th-Arcadia) resigns to become a judge of the Los Angeles County Superior Court 
December 31, 2021: Democratic assemblymember Jim Frazier (11th-Discovery Bay) resigns to work in the transportation sector
January 5, 2022: Democratic assemblymember Lorena Gonzales (80th-San Diego) resigns to become leader of the California Federation of Labor of the AFL–CIO 
January 31, 2022: Democratic assemblymember Autumn Burke (62nd-Marina Del Ray) resigns due to family challenges from the COVID-19 Pandemic
February 22, 2022: Democratic county administrator Mike Fong (Alhambra) is sworn into office after winning the February 15 special election for the 49th State Assembly district to replace Chau 
April 6, 2022: Democratic mayor Lori Wilson (Suisun City) is sworn into office after winning the April 5 special election for the 11th State Assembly district to replace Frazier 
May 3, 2022: Democratic county supervisor Matt Haney (San Francisco) is sworn into office after winning the April 19 special election for the 17th State Assembly district to replace Chiu 
June 15, 2022: Democratic former city councilmen David Alvarez (Barrio Logan) is sworn into office after winning the June 7 special election for the 80th State Assembly district to replace Gonzales 
June 20, 2022: Democratic activist and former legislative staffer Tina McKinnor (Hawthorne) is sworn into office after winning the June 7 special election for the 62nd State Assembly district to replace Burke

Leadership changes 
January 20, 2021: Republican senator Scott Wilk (21st–Santa Clarita) replaces senator Shannon Grove (16th–Bakersfield) as Senate minority leader, as Grove was ousted after she incorrectly blamed the 2021 storming of the United States Capitol on antifa.
January 19, 2022: Democratic senator Mike McGuire (2nd-Healdsburg) replaces senator Robert Hertzberg (18th-Van Nuys) as Senate majority leader
February 8, 2022: Republican assemblymember James Gallagher (3rd–Yuba City) replaces assemblymember Marie Waldron (75th–Valley Center) as Assembly minority leader.

Party changes

Legislation 
In 2022, notable laws passed included:

 A new court system for people with mental illness and addiction called the Community Assistance, Recovery and Empowerment Court ((CARE Court)
 AB257 for unionization of fast-food workers
 AB2011 and its companion SB6 for changing permitting processes to streamline affordable housing
 For climate change, a variety of climate-related bills which were part of an agenda by Governor Newsom, including:
 a bill which would keep the Diable Canyon nuclear power plant open until 2035
 a law named the California Climate Crisis Act, AB1279, which was similar to a proposed law of the same name in 2021 which did not pass
 For reproductive rights, expanded access to abortion
 For gun reform, laws which allowed victims of gun violence to sue gun manufacturers
 A law allowing the California Medical Board to discipline doctors who promote misinformation about COVID-19 vaccination
 On plastic pollution and plastic recycling, SB54 was passed which requires 65 percent of single-use plastic to be recycled by 2032; this law had been originally introduced in 2018 and had been the subject of lengthy negotiation over 4 years
In 2021, notable laws passed included:

 Several police reform laws, including SB2 which outlines a process for officers to be removed for misconduct, including facing potential civil liability
 A law to prevent wildfires through preventive measures, including through hiring more state employees
 A climate change law (AB1395) named the California Climate Crisis Act failed to pass, but a similar bill (AB1279) with the same name passed in 2022

State Senate

Officers 

The Secretary, the Sergeant-at-Arms, and the chaplain are not members of the Legislature.

Members

State Assembly

Officers 

The Chief Clerk, the acting Chief Sergeant-at-Arms, and the chaplain are not members of the Legislature.

Members

See also
 List of California state legislatures

References

External links 
 California State Senate
 California State Assembly

2021-22
2021 in California
2022 in California
California
California